Santa Maria Maggiore, also known as the church of San Francesco is a Roman Catholic church in the town of Miglionico, province of Matera, Basilicata, Italy.

The church with its romanesque belltower, is attached to a small Franciscan convent. The church is mainly notable for housing the Polyptych of Miglionico, a large 18 panel masterpiece painted by Cima da Conegliano in 1499. The work was purchased by the local bishop in 1598, and installed in this chapel in the 18th century.

References

Romanesque architecture in Basilicata
Churches in the province of Matera